The Cyprus Women's Basketball Division A is the top-tier level competition on the Cyprus basketball calendar for women. It is run and governed by the Cyprus Basketball Federation.

Format 
In 2021-22 season there were six teams competing in the league. In the first phase, each club plays the others three times, which makes a total of 15 games for each club.

In the second phase, the team that finished in first place plays against the team that finished in fourth place, and the team that finishes in second place plays against the team that finished in third place. The teams that win two times (best of three) proceed to the finals.

At the finals the teams that succeeded from the second phase play against each other, with the team that has the higher position in the first phase starting in their home ground. The first team that win three times (best of five) win the championship.

Teams 
The following teams (in alphabetical order) are competing in the 2021–22 season:
 AEL Limassol - Limassol
 Anagennisis Germasogias
 Anorthosis Famagusta
 ENAD - Ayios Dometios, Nicosia
 Keravnos - Strovolos, Nicosia
 UMAMI Zenonas

Champions

Performance by club

See also 
 Cypriot Basketball Cup
 Cypriot Basketball Super Cup
 Cypriot Women's Basketball Cup
 Cypriot Women's Basketball Super Cup

External links
 Cyprus Women's Basketball Division 1
 Cyprus Basketball Federation official site 
 Eurobasket.com League page
 Cyprusbasket.net Webpage with news about Cyprus basketball

Cyprus
Basketball leagues in Cyprus
Sports leagues established in 1987